Timothy P. Chartier (born 1969) is Joseph R. Morton Professor of Mathematics and Computer Science at Davidson College, known for his expertise in sports analytics and bracketology, for his popular mathematics books, and for the "mime-matics" shows combining mime and mathematics that he and his wife Tanya have staged.

Education and career
Chartier majored in applied mathematics at Western Michigan University, graduating in 1993, and stayed at Western Michigan for a master's degree in computational mathematics in 1996. He completed a Ph.D. at the University of Colorado Boulder in 2001, with the dissertation Algebraic Multigrid Based on Element Interpolation (AMGe) and Spectral AMGe supervised by Steve McCormick. He has also studied mime, at the Centre du Silence in Colorado, at the Dell'Arte International School of Physical Theatre in California, and with Marcel Marceau.

After postdoctoral research at the University of Washington, he joined the Davidson College faculty in 2003. As well as his academic work, he is also a frequent consultant on sports analytics for ESPN, NASCAR, the National Basketball Association, and other groups.

Books
Chartier is the author of Math Bytes: Google Bombs, Chocolate-Covered Pi, and Other Cool Bits in Computing (2014), which won the Euler Book Prize in 2020, and of When Life is Linear: From Computer Graphics to Bracketology (2015), which won the Beckenbach Book Prize in 2017.

He is also the author of X Games In Mathematics: Sports Training That Counts! (2020) and the coauthor, with Anne Greenbaum, of Numerical Methods: Design, Analysis, and Computer Implementation of Algorithms (2012).

References 

1969 births
Living people
21st-century American mathematicians
Western Michigan University alumni
University of Colorado Boulder alumni
Davidson College faculty